Jouhou is the second studio album by grindcore band Discordance Axis, originally released on vinyl format in February 1997 through Devour Records in a limited edition of 4000. The 1998 compact disc edition of the album included tracks taken from splits. The album was re-released on CD by Hydra Head Records on January 27, 2004. The song "Flow My Tears, the Policeman Said" is named after the novel of the same name by Philip K. Dick.

Background and recording
Recording sessions for the album were very stressful for the band, as members would frequently fight and argue. Tracks recorded for the album were either written before the sessions took place or were made up on the spot during studio time. Drums and guitars were recorded at Straight Jacket Studios, Allston, Massachusetts from July to August 1996. Vocals were recorded at Trax East, South River, New Jersey in September 1996, where the album was also mixed. Split material that's featured on the CD editions of the album were all recorded and mixed at Trax East in April 1995.

When the album was released in February 1997, the trio scheduled a tour in Japan to support the record. However, due to rising band tensions of scheduling conflicts, guitarist Rob Marton left the band, with Steve Procopio hired to fill in for his place. By the time the tour was completed in 1998, the group went on hiatus. In 1999, the band, including Marton, reunited and began to work on material that would eventually become their acclaimed third album The Inalienable Dreamless.

Track listing

Personnel
Discordance Axis
Jon Chang - vocals, artwork
Rob Marton - guitars
Dave Witte - drums

Production
Steve Evetts - engineering
Bill T. Miller - producing, recording
Yas Koketsu - photography
Bill Cathart - logo design

References

External links 
 
 
 

1997 albums
Hydra Head Records albums
Discordance Axis albums